Lilian Esoro is a Nigerian actress. Lilian Esoro was nominated for best actress in a comedy at 2013 Africa Magic Viewers Choice Awards.

Career
Esoro's acting career started in 2005 when she was cast by her friend Bovi to feature in the soap opera Extended Family. However, she became more notable when she was featured in the television series Clinic Matters playing Nurse Abigail.

In a 2013 list compiled by Vanguard, Esoro was listed as one of the top ten best new actresses in the film industry.

Personal life
Esoro grew up in Lagos State. She studied political science at University of Abuja.

In November 2015, she married Ubi Franklin. The couple divorced in January 2020.

Filmography

Television
Extended Family (as Freida)
Tinsel
Clinic Matters (as Nurse Abigail)
Taste of Love
Colour of deceits

Awards and nominations

Films
Strive
The Potter
The Next Door Neighbour
Secret Room (2013)
Fool's Paradise
The Real Deal (2014)
Couple of Days (2016)
Meet the In-Laws (2016)
A Lot Like Love (2018)
Jumbled (2019)
Alter Date (2019)

See also
List of Nigerian actors

References

Living people
Nigerian film actresses
Actresses from Lagos
University of Abuja alumni
Year of birth missing (living people)
21st-century Nigerian actresses
Nigerian television actresses